Lithophane franclemonti, known generally as Franclemont's Pinion, is a species of cutworm or dart moth in the family Noctuidae. The species is found in North America.

The MONA or Hodges number for Lithophane franclemonti is 9888.1.

References

Further reading

 
 
 

franclemonti
Articles created by Qbugbot
Moths described in 1998